The Fatima Al-Zahra Mosque is a Shia Islam mosque located in Arncliffe, a suburb of Sydney, New South Wales, Australia.
Established in 1980 by Sheikh Fahd Mehdi Al-3amili , it is Australia's first and largest Shia mosque and also one of the Australia's largest mosques.

Professor Ahmad Abdul Majeed Hammoud is perhaps the founder of Al Zahra College, which belongs to Al Zahra Mosque.  

Since the mosque was built there has been considerable real-estate development within its proximity and it is said that its voters are affecting Federal and State election outcomes.

There have been allegations of threats made against the worshippers at the mosque.

See also
 Islam in Australia
 List of mosques in Oceania
 Al-Rasool Al-A'dham Mosque

References

External links
Official Facebook

Mosques in Sydney
Mosques completed in 1980
Shia mosques in Australia
1980 establishments in Australia